The ABU TV Song Festival 2016 was the fifth annual edition of the ABU TV Song Festivals. The event, which is non-competitive, took place in Bali Nusa Dua Convention Centre, Bali, Indonesia, on 22 October 2016. Fourteen countries have confirmed their participation.  made their debut at the festival, while  and  returned after a one-year absence and a two-year absence respectively.  and  have both stated that they do not intend to make their debut at the festival.

Location

On 24 March 2016, it was announced by the Asia-Pacific Broadcasting Union (ABU) that one of Indonesian island, Bali, had been chosen to host the fifth edition of the TV Song Festival on 22 October 2016.

Host broadcaster
The ABU announced on 24 March 2016 that the fifth edition of the TV Song Festival will be co-organised by Indonesian national broadcasters, Televisi Republik Indonesia (TVRI) and Radio Republik Indonesia (RRI). The host broadcaster RRI revealed the logo for the 2016 TV Song Festival on 17 May 2016.

Format
The ABU TV Song Festival celebrates the popular music culture by showcasing high-profile musical acts from each of the participating ABU broadcasting members, in a non-competitive manner.

Action calendar
The ABU published an action calendar which details the organisational process for the ABU TV Song Festival 2016.
 March: Call for entries, participation form distributed.
 Mid-April: Application deadline.
 Mid-May: Registration deadline with payment to ABU.
 End-June: Participating ABU members confirm musical acts.
 August and September: Participating ABU members to submit materials, profiles and promotional videos.
 October: The 53rd ABU General Assembly in Bali, Indonesia.

List of participants

Other countries 
  – On 31 July 2016, it was announced by the Asia-Pacific Broadcasting Union (ABU) that India have withdrawn for the 2016 TV Song Festival.
  – On 31 July 2016, it was announced by the Asia-Pacific Broadcasting Union (ABU) that Malaysia have withdrawn for the 2016 TV Song Festival.
  – On 13 October 2016, the Mongolian National Broadcaster (MNB), announced that they had changed their mind about making a debut at the contest. MNB had initially selected Naran to represent them, but decided to decline participation for the second time.
  – On 2 June 2016, the national broadcaster for Myanmar, Myanmar Radio and Television (MRTV), announced that they would not be making their debut at the 2016 TV Song Festival.
  – On 19 October 2016, the national broadcaster for Thailand, Thai Public Broadcasting Service (TPBS), announced that they had changed their mind about making a return to the contest. TPBS had initially selected Sincharoen Brothers Band with the song "Dao Laum Deuan" to represent them, but decided to decline participation.
  – On 31 July 2016, it was announced by the Asia-Pacific Broadcasting Union (ABU) that Turkey have withdrawn for the 2016 TV Song Festival.
  – On 1 May 2016, the national broadcaster for Vanuatu, Vanuatu Broadcasting and Television Corporation (VBTC), announced that they would not be making their debut at the 2016 TV Song Festival.

The following list of countries have participated in the ABU TV Song Festival at least once, but didn't made any announcements in regards to their participation in the 2016 edition.

See also 
 ABU TV Song Festival
 ABU Radio Song Festival 2016
 Asia-Pacific Broadcasting Union
 Bala Turkvision Song Contest 2016
 Eurovision Song Contest 2016
 Eurovision Young Musicians 2016
 Junior Eurovision Song Contest 2016
 Turkvision Song Contest 2016

References

External links
 

ABU Song Festivals
2016 in Indonesia
Music of Bali
2016 song contests
Music festivals in Indonesia